Virginia's 85th House of Delegates district elects one of 100 seats in the Virginia House of Delegates, the lower house of the state's bicameral legislature. District 85 represents part of Virginia Beach, including the neighborhoods of Larkspur, Aragona, Mt. Trashmore, Fairfield and Arrowhead. The seat is currently held by Karen Greenhalgh.

Elections

2017

Special election
Outgoing delegate Scott Taylor was required to resign his seat in the House of Delegates upon his election to the United States House of Representatives in Virginia's 2nd Congressional district. A special election was held on January 10, 2017, between sheriff deputy Rocky Holcomb and local science teacher Cheryl Turpin. Holcomb defeated Turpin with 52.8% of the vote to Turpin's 47.05%.

General election
The following November, Holcomb and Turpin faced each other again during Virginia's general election. Turpin defeated Holcomb with 50.73% of the vote to Holcomb's 49.06%.

2019
Outgoing delegate Cheryl Turpin declined to seek reelection in order to run for Virginia's 7th Senate district. Former delegate Rocky Holcomb sought to reclaim his former seat but was defeated by Democrat Alex Askew by a margin of 51.7% to 48.3%.

District officeholders

References

Virginia House of Delegates districts
Virginia Beach, Virginia